Janil Arusha Puthucheary (born 1972) is a Malaysian-born Singaporean politician and paediatrician who has been serving as Minister of State for Communications and Information since 2018 and Minister of State for Health since 2020. He has also been serving as Party Whip of the People's Action Party since 2019. A member of the governing People's Action Party (PAP), he has been the Member of Parliament (MP) representing the Punggol Coast division of Pasir Ris–Punggol GRC since 2015.

Born in Malaysia, Puthucheary had worked as a paediatrician at hospitals in the United Kingdom, Australia and Singapore before he became a Singapore citizen in 2008. 

He made his political debut in the 2011 general election as part of a six-member PAP team contesting in Pasir Ris–Punggol GRC, and won 64.79% of the vote. Puthucheary was elected as the Member of Parliament representing the Punggol West ward of Pasir Ris–Punggol GRC. 

Since then, he had retained his parliamentary seat in the subsequent general elections and had switched to representing the Punggol Coast ward of Pasir Ris–Punggol GRC after the 2015 general election. He had since been serving as Minister of State and later Senior Minister of State at the Ministries of Communication and Information (2016–2017, 2020–present), Education (2016–2018), Transport (2018–2020), and Health (2020–present). He has also been the Government Whip since June 2019 and chairman of the PAP's youth wing.

Education 
Puthucheary attended primary school in Kuala Lumpur before going to Oundle School in Northamptonshire for his secondary education. 

He completed his training as a paediatrician at Queen's University Belfast and the Royal College of Physicians.

Career 
Puthucheary worked at hospitals in Belfast, London and Sydney before he moved to Singapore in 2001 to work at KK Women's and Children's Hospital as a Senior Consultant at the children's intensive care unit. In 2007, he became an Assistant Professor and Medical Director for Faculty Development at the Duke-NUS Graduate Medical School.

Political career 
Puthucheary made his political debut in the 2011 general election when he joined a six-member PAP team contesting in Pasir Ris–Punggol GRC. After his candidacy was announced, he attracted attention as he had not served national service as new citizens are not required to. He was also compared with Chen Show Mao, a foreign-born Workers' Party candidate who had served national service as a second generation Singapore Permanent Resident. In response, Puthucheary said that he had spent the past ten years saving children's lives. Low Thia Khiang, the Workers' Party chief, called for an amendment to the Constitution to allow only male candidates who have served national service to run for elections. The PAP team in Pasir Ris–Punggol GRC won with 64.79% of the vote against the Singapore Democratic Alliance. Puthucheary thus became a Member of Parliament representing the Punggol West ward of Pasir Ris–Punggol GRC.

Puthucheary contested as part of a six-member PAP team in Pasir Ris–Punggol GRC in the 2015 general election and they won with 72.89% of the vote against the Singapore Democratic Alliance. On 1 January 2016, he was appointed Minister of State at the Ministry of Communications and Information and Ministry of Education. On 1 May 2017, he was promoted to Senior Minister of State and continued serving at the Ministry of Education only. On 1 May 2018, his appointments were changed to Senior Minister of State at the Ministry of Communications and Information and the Ministry of Transport. On 6 June 2019, he was appointed Government Whip.

During the 2020 general election, Puthucheary contested as part of a five-member PAP team in Pasir Ris–Punggol GRC and they won with 64.16% of the vote against the Singapore Democratic Alliance. After the election, Puthucheary switched to representing the Punggol Coast ward of Pasir Ris–Punggol GRC. On 27 July 2020, he dropped his appointment as Senior Minister of State at the Ministry of Transport while continuing to serve as Senior Minister of State at the Ministry of Communications and Information. In addition, he was appointed Senior Minister of State at the Ministry of Health.

Personal life 
Puthucheary's father is Dominic Puthucheary, a trade unionist and founding member of the People's Action Party (MP) who later left the party to join Barisan Sosialis, a party formed by expelled left-wing PAP members. 

Dominic Puthucheary was detained in February 1963 during Operation Coldstore but was released ten months later and barred from entering Singapore until 1990, when he was elected MP for Nibong Tebal in Penang, Malaysia. 

Puthucheary was born in Malaysia when his parents were living there. Puthucheary became a Singapore citizen in 2008. 

He was also in the first batch of the Singapore Armed Forces Volunteer Corps, which was established on 13 October 2014.

Puthucheary is married with three sons.

References

External links 
 Janil Puthucheary on Parliament of Singapore
 Janil Puthucheary at pap.org.sg

Members of the Parliament of Singapore
People's Action Party politicians
Singaporean paediatricians
1972 births
Living people
Malaysian people of Indian descent
Singaporean people of Indian descent
Malaysian emigrants to Singapore
People who lost Malaysian citizenship
Naturalised citizens of Singapore